And You Thought Your Parents Were Weird is a 1991 science fiction family film written and directed by Tony Cookson; foreign language releases were titled RoboDad.

Plot

Two boys, Joshua (Joshua John Miller) and Max (Edan Gross) attempt to invent a fully mobile robot with advanced artificial intelligence to help their mother, Sarah (Marcia Strassman) with household chores.  However, after a playfully performed séance on Halloween, the ghost of their late father, Matthew (Alan Thicke), possesses the robot. The boys are overjoyed at the return of their father, but it soon becomes apparent that the people who stole their father's work are after their robot, Newman.  Eventually, Matthew returns to the afterlife after setting his boys on the right path as they sell the plans for their robot to a rich Texan investor.

Song
The film features the song; 'Love Breaks the Rules' written by John W. Daniel and sung by Jane Barnett and Larry Hoppen.

References

External links
 
 
 
 

1991 films
American science fiction comedy films
1990s English-language films
1990s science fiction comedy films
American robot films
Trimark Pictures films
1991 comedy films
1990s American films